Justification may refer to:
 Justification (epistemology), a property of beliefs that a person has good reasons for holding
 Justification (jurisprudence), defence in a prosecution for a criminal offenses
 Justification (theology), God's act of declaring or making a sinner righteous before God
 Justification (typesetting), a kind of typographic alignment
 Rationalization (making excuses), a phenomenon in psychology

See also 
 Justify
 Justified